"There Is a Star" is a song recorded by German Eurodance act Pharao, released in September 1994 as the second single from their debut album, Pharao (1994). Commercially the song was presented with the slogan, "Wise men follow stars...". It scored chart success in Finland, where it peaked at number three, and in Germany, where it peaked at number eight. In Canada, the single reached number seven on the RPM Dance/Urban chart. A music video was also produced to promote the single, directed by Nigel Simpkiss.

Chart performance
"There Is a Star" was a major hit on the charts in Europe and remains the act's most successful song, along with "I Show You Secrets". It entered the top 10 in Finland (3) and Germany (8). Additionally, the single entered the top 20 in Austria (16), Sweden (14) and Switzerland (12), and the top 40 in the Netherlands (37) and Scotland (38). On the Eurochart Hot 100, "There Is a Star" reached its highest position as number 21 in February 1995, while it reached number two on the European Dance Radio Chart. In the United Kingdom, it ended up at number 43 in its first week on the UK Singles Chart, on February 26, 1995. On the UK Dance Singles Chart, the song fared better, reaching number 30. On the UK Club Chart, it peaked at number 75. Outside Europe, "There Is a Star" peaked at number seven on the RPM Dance/Urban chart in Canada. 

The song was awarded with a gold record in Germany, with a sale of 250,000 singles.

Critical reception
Chuck Campbell from Knoxville News Sentinel felt "the act twirls gleefully through the springy grooves of rave-ish, techno-y modern dance music." James Hamilton from Music Weeks RM Dance Update described the song as a "MTV plugged typical bland spacey Euro galloper". 

Music video
The accompanying music video for "There Is a Star" was directed by Nigel Simpkiss. It features the act performing the song inside what appears to be an electronic pyramid. The video was A-listed on Germany's VIVA in December 1994.

Track listings
 12 single, Germany "There Is a Star" (No. 1 Space Hymn Track) – 6:23
 "There Is a Star" (Videostar Mix) – 3:54
 "There Is a Star" (X-Tra Terrestrial Housemix) – 5:07
 "There Is a Star" (Universe Of Trance) – 5:39

 CD single, 12" maxi - Remixes "There Is a Star" (Interplanetary Fun Mix) – 6:26
 "There Is a Star" (Galactic Space Race) – 5:59
 "There Is a Star" (Supernova Mix) – 7:01

 CD maxi, Europe'
 "There Is a Star" (Radiostar Videomix) – 3:54
 "There Is a Star" (No.1 Space Hymn Track) – 6:23
 "There Is a Star" (X-Tra Terrestrial Housemix) – 5:07
 "There Is a Star" (Universe Of Trance) – 5:39

Charts

Weekly charts

Year-end charts

Certifications

References

1994 singles
1994 songs
Blow Up singles
Pharao songs
Dance Pool singles
English-language German songs
Music videos directed by Nigel Simpkiss